Eshkiyet (also Romanized as Eshkīyet) is a village in Amlash-e Shomali Rural District, in the Central District of Amlash County, Gilan Province, Iran. At the 2006 census, its population was 115, in 35 families.

References 

Populated places in Amlash County